Computerized Coloring Books is a collection of three games developed by Capstone Software and published by its parent company IntraCorp for MS-DOS and Amiga. A port for Windows 3.1 was planned but never released. The games are based on Bill Kroyer's film FernGully: The Last Rainforest, Don Bluth's film Rock-a-Doodle, and John Hughes's film Home Alone. The Rock-a-Doodle game was as released with Trolls and An American Tail: The Computer Adventures of Fievel and His Friends on the Capstone CD Game Kids Collection.

Gameplay
The games work as basic computerized coloring books, which require the player to fill in a line art picture. There are 16 colors available, which can be mixed for up to 256 colors. The player can choose from a selection of backgrounds and add any characters to the picture, both of which are based on scenes and characters of the respective films. The products support a wide range of printers, including dot matrix, color and laser printers.

Promotion
The FernGully product was designed to follow an environmentally friendly policy, by optionally using a computer instead of consumable paper, and using recycled paper. A coloring contest accompanied the product launch, including entry forms, for a $100 prize.

References

1992 video games
Amiga games
Cancelled Windows games
DOS games
Drawing video games
Video games based on films
Video games developed in the United States
Children's educational video games
IntraCorp games